Biturana is an administrative ward in Muhambwe Constituency in Kibondo District of Kigoma Region in Tanzania. In 2016 the Tanzania National Bureau of Statistics report there were 3,958 people in the ward.

Prior to 2014 Bitarana was a village of Kibondo Mjini ward.

Villages / neighborhoods 
The ward has 10 hamlets.

 Biturana Magharibi
 Biturana Mashariki
 Biturana Mtoni
 Biturana Shuleni
 Mlengasemo
 Nayakayuki
 Nyampengere
 Nyampengere
 Nyarugoti
 Rugimba

References

Kibondo District
Wards of Kigoma Region
Constituencies of Tanzania